Lissam is the Ussa Local Government Area headquarters in Taraba State in the Middle Belt region of Nigeria. The postal code of the area is 671.

References

Populated places in Taraba State